Rasmané Ouédraogo (born 30 July 1988) is a Burkinabé former professional cyclist.

Major results

2009
 7th Overall Tour du Faso
2010
 2nd Overall Tour du Faso
 5th Overall Tour du Cameroun
1st Stage 1
 8th Overall Tour du Mali
2011
 3rd Road race, National Road Championships
 3rd Overall Tour du Cameroun
1st Stage 5
 3rd Overall Tour du Faso
1st Young rider classification
1st Stage 8
 9th Challenge Youssoufia, Challenge des phosphates
2012
 1st  Road race, National Road Championships
 1st Overall Tour du Faso
 4th Team time trial, African Road Championships
2013
 2nd Road race, National Road Championships
 4th Overall Tour du Faso
 5th Team time trial, African Road Championships
2014
 2nd Road race, National Road Championships
 7th Trophée de la Maison Royale, Challenge du Prince
2015
 Tour of the Democratic Republic of Congo
1st Stages 5 & 8
 1st Stage 10 Tour du Faso
 2nd Overall Tour du Cameroun
 8th Team time trial, African Road Championships

References

External links

1988 births
Living people
Burkinabé male cyclists
21st-century Burkinabé people